The V South American Games (Spanish: Juegos Sudamericanos; Portuguese: Jogos Sul-Americanos) were a multi-sport event held in 1994 in Valencia, Carabobo, Venezuela, with some events in Puerto Cabello (boxing, judo, karate, wrestling) and Caracas (shooting). The Games were organized by the South American Sports Organization (ODESUR).  An appraisal of the games and detailed medal lists were published
elsewhere,
emphasizing the results of the Argentinian teams.

Torch lighter at the Polideportivo Misael Delgado was local swimmer Ramón Volcán.  Aruba, the Netherlands Antilles, and Panamá had their first appearance at the games, enhancing the number of participating nations to 14.

The games were initially awarded to Montevideo, Uruguay, but the local officials declined in 1992.

Medal count
The medal count for these Games is tabulated below. This table is sorted by the number of gold medals earned by each country.  The number of silver medals is taken into consideration next, and then the number of bronze medals.

Sports

Aquatic sports
 Swimming
 Athletics
 Baseball
 Bowling
 Boxing
 Canoeing
Cycling
 Road Cycling
 Track Cycling
 Fencing
 Football
Gymnastics
 Artistic Gymnastics
 Rhythmic Gymnastics
 Judo
 Karate
 Shooting
 Softball
 Table Tennis
 Taekwondo
 Tennis
 Weightlifting
 Wrestling

References

External links
Valencia 94 ODESUR page

 
South American Games
S
S
S
Multi-sport events in Venezuela
Valencia, Venezuela
Sport in Carabobo
November 1994 sports events in South America